Darreh Panbeh Dan may refer to:
 Darreh Panbeh Dan, Saqqez
 Darreh Panbeh Dan, Ziviyeh, Saqqez County